A Time For Heroes was the theme of the 1987 International Summer Special Olympics World Games. The theme was composed by Jon Lyons; the instrumental versions were performed by Tangerine Dream and the vocal version was performed by Meat Loaf and Brian May.

Track listing

Personnel
 Jon Lyons – composer
 Christopher Franke
 Edgar Froese
 Paul Haslinger
 John Van Tongeren

Credits vocal version
 Written by M. Scott Sotebeer, Jon Lyons and Rik Emmett
 Produced and arranged by Jon Lyons
 Executive producer: M. Scott Sotebeer
 Associate producer: John Van Tongeren
 Mixed by Jay Rifkin and Jon Lyons at the Hit Factory, New York City
 Recorded at the Hit Factory, Record Plant, West Lake Audio, and Sine Wave Studios
 Meat Loaf – lead vocals
 Brian May – lead guitar solo
 Bob Kulick – rhythm guitar
 Jon Lyons — bass, acoustic guitar, additional keyboards and synthesizers
 John Van Tongeren — piano, synthesizers
 Bill Boydstun – additional synthesizer programming
 Chuck Bürgi – drums
 Gina Ricci, Amy Goff, Elaine Goff – backing vocals

References

1987 EPs
1987 singles
1987 songs